Vilacolum is a village in the municipality of Torroella de Fluvià, 10 km south-east of Figueres in Alt Empordà, Catalonia.

Populated places in Alt Empordà